Akgedik Dam is a dam in Muğla Province, Turkey, built in 1995.

See also
List of dams and reservoirs in Turkey

External links
DSI

Dams in Muğla Province
Dams completed in 1995